The Finnish Academy of Science and Letters (Finnish Suomalainen Tiedeakatemia; Latin Academia Scientiarum Fennica) is a Finnish learned society. It was founded in 1908 and is thus the second oldest academy in Finland. The oldest is the Finnish Society of Sciences and Letters, which was founded in 1838.

Members 

The academy has a total of 328 seats for Finnish members. When a member of the academy turns 65 years, his seat is free for selection of a new member, but he remains a full member until death. The seats are divided into two sections

Section of Science 
 Mathematics and Computer Science 28 members
 Physics and Astronomy 26 members
 Geosciences 24 members
 Chemistry 21 members
 Biology 22 members
 Agriculture and Forestry 22 members
 Medicine 46 members

189 seats

Section of the Humanities 
 Theology and Religion 11 members
 Philosophy and Aesthetics 12 members
 Psychology and Pedagogy 14 members
 History and Archaeology 17 members
 Finno-Ugric Studies 17 members
 Linguistics 21 members
 Jurisprudence 18 members
 Social sciences 29 members

139 seats

Foreign members
Since 1924, foreign members have also been invited to the academy. A foreign scientist who has proven to be a leading researcher can be elected as a foreign member. The selection of foreign members follows the same strict principles as the selection of domestic members. Foreign members represent the best of science around the world.

Vaisala Prize 
The Vaisala Prize was established by the Finnish Academy of Sciences and Letters in cooperation with the Väisälä Foundation. The prize is awarded to outstanding scientists in the active parts of their careers in the fields of mathematics and natural sciences. The prize is awarded by the Board of the Finnish Academy of Science and Letters. The first prize was awarded in 2000 and has been awarded annually since then. The Vaisala Prize is analogous to the Fields Prize for young mathematicians and has the same remuneration of 15 thousand, but is paid in euros (for 2021 this is about one and a half more than the Fields Prize due to the difference in exchange rates of euro and canadian dollar).

See also
 :Category:Members of the Finnish Academy of Science and Letters
 :Category:Vaisala Prize Laureates

References

External links
 Finnish Academy of Science and Letters, official website
 The Finnish Academy of Science and Letters , a presentation (at the website of the University of St Andrews).

Science and technology in Finland
Finnish culture
Finland
Finland
1908 establishments in Finland
Scientific organizations established in 1908
Learned societies of Finland